Adam Payne (born November 3, 1970) is a former American professional  track cyclist and road bicycle racer. He is a World Cup, Pan American Championships, and Multi National Championship medalist.

Major achievements 
 World Cup
 Silver Medal – Team Pursuit (1997)
 
 Pan American Championships
 Bronze Medal - Kilometer (1995)
 
US National Championships

Gold Medal - Junior Pursuit (1988)

Gold Medal - Masters Team Pursuit (2007)

Silver Medal and Olympic Team Alternate - Elite Team Pursuit (1996)

Silver Medal - Elite Team Pursuit (1997)

Bronze Medal - Junior Points Race (1987)

Bronze Medal - Junior Kilometer (1988)

US Track Cup

Gold Medal - Points Race - EDS Track Cup - Houston TX (1997)

Gold Medal - Team Pursuit - EDS Track Cup - Houston TX (1997)
{
Gold Medal - Points Race - EDS Track Cup - Carson CA (1998)

Gold Medal - Kilometer - EDS Track Cup - Indianapolis IN (1998)

Gold Medal - Team Pursuit - EDS Track Cup - Trexlertown PA (1998)

References 

1970 births
Living people
American male cyclists
People from Atlanta